, also known as Zatoichi Meets the One-Armed Swordsman and The Blind Swordsman Meets His Equal, is a 1971 Japanese-Hong Kong chambara / wuxia crossover by Japanese film director Kimiyoshi Yasuda and Chinese film director Hsu Tseng Hung. The film stars Shintaro Katsu as the blind swordsman Zatoichi and Jimmy Wang Yu as the "One-Armed Swordsman" Wang Kang. It is a crossover of the long-running Zatoichi series and the One-Armed Swordsman film series.

The Chinese edit of the film reportedly featured a different ending where Wang Kang was victorious in the final duel, rather than Zatoichi.

Plot
While traveling the Japanese countryside the blind masseur Zatoichi (Shintaro Katsu) comes across the One Armed Swordsman, Wang Kang (Jimmy Wang Yu), who is in hiding and protecting a child from a corrupt Japanese priest and a group of yakuza. Zatoichi and Wang Kang, each from very different worlds yet heroic swordsman in their own right, at first seem to get along but a language barrier and a series of misunderstanding leads Kang to distrust Ichi. Soon the two heroes are at each other throats while each attempts to stop the true villains from taking the child.

Cast
Shintaro Katsu as Zatoichi
Jimmy Wang Yu as Wang Kang
Yūko Hama as Osen
Michie Terada as Oyone
Kōji Nanbara as Kakuzen
Tokue Hanasawa as Yosaku
Shinsuke Minami as Henoichi
Shirō Itō as Shinshichi
Toru Abe as Boss Tōbei
Cheung Yik as Li Xiangrong
Wang Ling as Li Yumei

Production
 Yoshinobu Nishioka - Art director

References

External links

Zatoichi Meets The One-Armed Swordsman at Hong Kong Cinemagic

1971 films
1971 action films
Hong Kong action films
1970s Japanese-language films
Films about amputees
Films directed by Kimiyoshi Yasuda
Films set in China
Films set in Japan
Kung fu films
Hong Kong martial arts films
Wuxia films
Zatoichi films
1970s Hong Kong films
1970s Japanese films